Iranian Academy of Arts (IAA) (formally Academy of Arts of the Islamic Republic of Iran) was established in March 2000. It is one of the four academies of the Islamic Republic of Iran; the other three are: the Iranian Academy of Medical Sciences, the Iranian Academy of Sciences and the Academy of Persian Language and Literature. The IIA is an authorized entity affiliated with presidential administration.

http://honar.ac.ir

Presidency 
Mir Hossein Mousavi served as president for 11 years until he was removed in 2009. Ali Mo'alem Damghani was selected as second president of Academy in December 2009 by the Supreme Council of Cultural Revolution. In 2018  Alireza Esmaeli promoted as acting president of the academy for 3 years, when in March 2021 {{Dr. Bahman Namvar Motlaq}} elected as the new president of the academy through the processes of the supreme cultural council and approved by the President Hasan Rouhani. 

Namavr Motlaq himself has been a permanent member of the academy.

Organization 
The academy consists of the president of the country as the supreme chancellor of the academies, the board of trustees, the general assembly, the president of the academy, and the experts council.

The academy has nine specialized departments as follows:
Department of Dramatic Arts
Department of Music
Department of Architecture and Urban Planning
Department of Handicrafts and Traditional Arts
Department of Visual Arts
Department of Cinema
Department of Philosophy and Theosophy
Department of Multimedia Arts
Department of Semiology of Arts

Objectives 
Among the major objectives of the Iranian Academy of Arts are: proposing policies for the preservation and promotion of Islamic, national and local arts; research and utilization of new art theories with reliance on the national and Islamic fundamentals; support and encouragement of basic research and following up the implementation of art projects and studies at national level; annual evaluation of art indices in the country; and studying the shortcomings of the educational system of the country in the field of art and offering proposals to the related institutions.

Members 
The Academy has three types of members including permanent, associate and honorary members. All members are admitted on the proposal of the president of the Academy or that of at least five members of General Assembly and approval of the General Assembly and acknowledgment of the President of the Academy. All regular members must be at least associate professors, or be among Iranian prominent artists and hold Iranian nationality. Foreign outstanding artists and art researchers can be admitted as honorary members into Academy.

According to article 16 of the Academy's charter, the Iranian Academy of Arts will have thirty regular members, all experts and artists active in various fields, twenty of whom will be elected by the Art Council's nomination and the Cultural Revolution Supreme Council's approval, and the remaining ten will be elected by the latter twenty.

Divisions
The Central Building
Saba Cultural and Art Institute (SCAI)
Aseman Cultural-Artistic Complex (ACAC)
Palestine Museum of Contemporary Arts (PMCA)
Naghsh-e Jahan Art Research Center (NJARC)
Art Research Center (ARC)
Especialized Library

External links 
 
 English Website

References 

Iranian art
Arts councils
Arts Academy
Arts organizations established in 2000
Cultural organisations based in Iran